The Follow Up and Arrangement Committee was an alliance of Iraqi opposition groups formed in the run up to the invasion of Iraq in 2003.

Members
The members of the committee were:

References

Defunct political party alliances in Iraq